Illegal Tender can refer to:
 Illegal Tender (Louis XIV)
 Illegal Tender (film)